National Vodka Day is a marketing creation of Nir Knaan that has been celebrated in the United States on October 4 since at least 2009.  It has its own website, has been mentioned by Wine Enthusiast Magazine, and has been noted on news websites such as CBS.  National Vodka Day falls the marketing trend of having a food or drink to celebrate in the fashion of a holiday for each day of the calendar year.  Many are documented at the website for American Food and Drink Days.   Indeed, National Vodka Day is also National Taco Day.

Additionally, an event  has been created to institute an Annual Toast for National Vodka Day in Pittsburgh, Pennsylvania at 6 pm EST. This has been announced on their website for Clique Vodka.

See also

 List of food days

References

Notes

Further reading
 Bottoms up: National Vodka Day is here - The Globe and Mail
 Weirdest vodka flavors for National Vodka Day. Fox News. October 4, 2013.
 Cold, Clear, Strong: National Vodka Day | NBC Southern California
 National Vodka Day?! Let’s Raise a Glass! - Twin Cities Taste - October 2013 - Minnesota
 The Day - Nostrovia! National Vodka Day is coming up | News from southeastern Connecticut

External links
 

Alcoholic drinks
Observances in the United States
Unofficial observances 
October observances
Observances about food and drink